Su Ning (January 31, 1953 – April 29, 1991) was a Chinese military officer.

Career
As a soldier, he was the top-ranked  trainee. In the army, he worked as a soldier, a platoon leader, a company commander, a staff officer, and a battalion commander. He led his group to victory in a military skills competition. He wrote more than 70 pages about Army technology.

Death 
On April 21, 1991, Su Ning was commanding a team to train how to throw live grenades. One trainee threw a grenade. It hit a wall and bounced back. Su Ning shouted out for everyone to drop to the ground and he moved to get rid of it. As he picked it up, the grenade exploded. He was sent to hospital for treatment; after 8 days, he died and the soldier survived.

In 1993, the Central Military Commission granted him the honorary title, "Model of all officers dedicated to the modernization of national defence".

The regiment in which Su Ning served was renamed "Su Ning Regiment".

Personal life
When Su Ning died, his son was eight. In 1998, Su Renren enlisted in Su Ning Regiment. He received a Military master's degree in 2007 and returned to Su Ning Regiment. He successively held the post of platoon leader, company political instructor and secretary of the political department.

In popular culture
The movie The Artillery Major is based on Su Ning. The director is Zhao Weiheng, the scenarists are Hao Zhongsu() and Du Shoulin. The film starred Zhou Lijing() and Lü Xiaohe. It was made by Changchun Film Studio in 1993.

References

External links
Hudong.com

1953 births
1991 deaths
Chinese Communist Party politicians from Shanxi
Politicians from Lüliang
People's Republic of China politicians from Shanxi